Josef Vávra was a Czech wrestler. He competed in the men's Greco-Roman light heavyweight at the 1928 Summer Olympics.

References

External links
 

Year of birth missing
Year of death missing
Czech male sport wrestlers
Olympic wrestlers of Czechoslovakia
Wrestlers at the 1928 Summer Olympics
Place of birth missing